XL from Coast to Coast is the third album by alternative rock group Alien Crime Syndicate released in 2002 through V2 and The Control Group, incorporating influences like The Replacements and Urge Overkill. The Japanese edition contains a cover of Elton John's "Don't Go Breaking My Heart" recorded with Duff McKagan and Kim Warnick.

Track listing
All songs written by Joe Reineke, except where noted.

Personnel
Alien Crime Syndicate
Joe Reineke - vocals, guitar
Mike Squires - guitar 
Jeff Rouse - bass, vocals
Nabil Ayers - drums

Production personnel
Joe Reineke - production, mixing
Troy Tietjen - mixing
Rick Fisher - mastering

References

2002 albums
Alien Crime Syndicate albums
V2 Records albums